The  Tavistock and Portman NHS Foundation Trust is a specialist mental health trust based in north London. The Trust specialises in talking therapies. The education and training department caters for 2,000 students a year from the United Kingdom and abroad. The Trust is based at the Tavistock Centre in Swiss Cottage. The founding organisation was the Tavistock institute of medical psychology founded in 1920 by Dr. Hugh Crichton-Miller.

The Tavistock and Portman NHS Trust was formed in 1994, when the Tavistock Clinic merged with the neighbouring Portman Clinic in Fitzjohn's Avenue. The Portman specialises in areas of forensic psychiatry, including the treatment of addictive, sociopathic and criminal behaviours and tendencies.

It has developed as a centre of excellence for psychoanalysis within the NHS since being included at its founding in 1948. The Trust and predecessor organisations have been influential beyond medicine, including in the British Army, management consultancy, prison and probation services.

Early history

It owes its name to the fact that its original location was in Tavistock Square in central London. When it moved later to larger premises, it took its name with it.
Although Hugh Crichton-Miller was a psychiatrist who developed psychological treatments for shell-shocked soldiers during and after the First World War, clinical services were always destined for both children and adults. The clinic's first patient was a child. From its foundation it was also clear that to offer free treatment to all who need it meant that the Tavistock Clinic needed to generate income by providing training to clinical professionals who could eventually help people across the UK and beyond. The clinical staff were also researchers. These principles remain influential to this day.

Following its foundation the Tavistock Clinic developed a focus on preventive psychiatry, expertise in group relations – including army officer selection – social psychiatry, and action research. There was an openness to different streams of research and thought as, for instance, the famous series of lectures given by the Swiss psychiatrist and one time collaborator of Sigmund Freud, Dr. Carl Jung, which were attended by doctors, churchmen and members of the public, including H. G. Wells and Samuel Beckett.

Its staff, who were still mainly unpaid honorary psychiatrists, psychologists and social workers, were interested in researching and consulting to leadership within the armed forces. The staff also offered treatment to members of the civilian population who might be traumatised by the prospect of a further world war, which could bring bombing of cities, evacuation of children and the shocks of loss and bereavement.

Post-war history
After the Second World War, the Tavistock Clinic benefited from the Northfield Hospital experience and from the arrival of talented professionals from Europe, many fleeing Nazi persecution. In 1948 it became a leading clinic within the newly created National Health Service. At this point its education and training services were managed separately by the Tavistock Institute for Medical Psychology, which was also the umbrella for the Tavistock Institute, involved in social action research and thinking about group relations and organisational dynamics, and for work with marital couples. The clinic was managed on a democratic model by a professional committee and developed further its distinct focus on multi-disciplinary and community-centred work.

Children and young people
New developments in child and adolescent mental health were particularly fruitful in the immediate post-war period. In 1948 the creation of the children's department supported the development of training in child and adolescent psychotherapy. Dr John Bowlby supported this new training and naturalistic infant observation. He also developed Attachment Theory. Husband and wife clinicians James Robertson and Joyce Robertson showed in their film work the impact of separation in temporary substitute care on young children for example, when their parent was admitted to hospital.
The Tavistock Clinic opened its Adolescent Department in 1959, recognising the distinctive developmental needs and difficulties of younger and older adolescents. In 1967 it absorbed the London Child Guidance Clinic, founded in 1929.

In 1989 the Tavistock established the Gender Identity Development Service (GIDS), a highly specialised clinic for young people presenting with difficulties with their gender identity.
In July 2022, following a critical independent review from Dr Hilary Cass, it was announced that this service would be discontinued and replaced with regional clinics providing a more "holistic" approach.

Training in education
By the 1960s The Tavistock Clinic was also providing both 1-year and 4-year professional training courses in educational psychology, the latter embracing a teacher training element through Leicester University School of Education. For a number of years the senior tutor and principal psychologist for these courses was Irene Caspari who did much to promote the concept and practice of Educational therapy. In the 1970s systemic psychotherapy became the Tavistock Clinic's newest professional training. Applications of the clinical ideas and skills of its multidisciplinary clinicians are at the heart of its education and training, with academically validated programmes developing from the early 1990s with the University of East London, and later with the University of Essex and Middlesex University.

Reflecting on the workplace
Work discussion, supervised clinical practice and experiential group relations work are central to many trainings all of which aim to equip mental health workers with the emotional, organisational, and relational capacities to operate confidently in front line settings. A BBC TV series 'Talking Cure: Jan' brought the work of the Clinic to a wider audience in 1999 and remains relevant today. Organisational consultancy by former CEO, Dr. Anton Obholzer, featured in the TV series, and their edited collection, with Vega Roberts, 'The Unconscious at Work: Individual and Organizational Stress in the Human Services', remains one of the classic texts to emerge from the Tavistock Clinic.

Public sphere
The Tavistock's tradition of social and political engagement has been renewed in recent years through its programme of Policy Seminars which model a dialogic, exploratory approach to policy analysis and debate with the social epidemiologist, Richard G. Wilkinson, the psychologist, Oliver James and the columnist, Polly Toynbee, among recent contributors. The series of Thinking Space events follows a similar model of participatory engagement around themes of diversity, racism, and sexual orientation.

The Tavistock Institute, which had been part of the Tavistock family, moved to its own premises in 1994. The Tavistock Centre for Couples Relationships, TCCR, formerly the Tavistock Institute of Marital Studies, was always a separate, charitably-funded organisation which left the Tavistock Centre for new premises in 2009.

NHS Trust
In 1994, the Tavistock Clinic joined with the Portman Clinic to become the Tavistock and Portman NHS Trust. In 2006 the Trust acquired NHS Foundation Trust status and become the Tavistock and Portman NHS Foundation Trust. It is an active member of UCL Partners, the Academic Health Service Centre located in North London.

Paul Burstow, a former Minister of State for Care and Support in the Cameron-Clegg coalition government, became Chair of the Trust in November 2015.

Services
The Trust provides clinical services for children and families, young people and adults. It also provides multi-disciplinary training and education. These programmes include core professional training, for example in psychiatry, psychology, social work and advanced psychotherapy training, as well as applied programmes for anyone working in the mental health or social care workforce.

Since 2010, the clinical work of the Trust has diversified with new services such as the Family Drug and Alcohol Court in Milton Keynes and the City and Hackney community psychotherapy service.

It is the largest provider of transgender services in England, but funding for the service has not kept pace with demand. In August 2019, 5,717 people were on the waiting list for a first appointment, and average waiting time was about two years. The Gender Identity Development Service (GIDS) at the Tavistock Centre has come under scrutiny due to reports that concerns over children's welfare were "shut down". The Tavistock and Portman NHS Trust defended their practices. In July 2022, following criticism in the interim report by Dr Hilary Cass, it was announced that this service would be discontinued and replaced with regional clinics providing a more "holistic" approach.

In February 2023 BBC journalist Hannah Barnes released a book called Time to Think: The Inside Story of the Collapse of the Tavistock's Gender Service for Children.  Barnes describes the premise saying, "I wanted to write a definitive record of what happened [at GIDS] because there needs to be one."

Performance
It was named by the Health Service Journal as one of the top hundred NHS trusts to work for in 2015.  At that time it had 449 full-time equivalent staff and a sickness absence rate of 0.92%. 84% of staff recommend it as a place for treatment and 73% recommended it as a place to work.

The Trust borrowed £58 million in 2016 which it intends to repay by selling its current sites.

Notable contributors to the clinic

Over the years many hundreds of staff members, at all levels, have contributed to the work of this institution. This list is merely representative of some of the lasting contributors to the different fields encompassed by the Clinic.

Medical directors, chief executives and Chair of Trust

 Hugh Crichton-Miller 1920–1933
 John Rawlings Rees 1933–1947
 J. D. Sutherland 1947–1968
 Robert H. Gosling 1968–1985
 Anton Obholzer 1985–2002
 Nick Temple 2002–2015 
 Matthew Patrick 
 Paul Jenkins

The Scottish Institute of Human Relations

In line with Hugh Crichton-Miller's original vision for clinics to be set up in communities across the country, his dream was not realised in his 'native' Scotland for another 50 years. However, with Jock Sutherland's return to Edinburgh in 1968, he became the catalyst for the formation of an organisation modelled on the London centre, albeit on a smaller scale. The Scottish Institute of Human Relations (SIHR), now defunct, was constituted as a charitable educational institution in Edinburgh in the early 1970s. Eventually a branch was opened in Glasgow. The 'MacTavi', as it was sometimes fondly called, worked closely with the National Health Service in Scotland and provided psychoanalytic training and courses for professionals in the health and educational systems and beyond. It also guided adults and children into treatment for the forty years of its operation. SIHR was finally dissolved in 2013 and its centres closed down. Some of its functions were taken over by a number of other organisations, specifically psychoanalytic training has become the remit of the Scottish Association for Psychoanalytic Psychotherapy (SAPP).

See also

References

External links
 
 Tavistock Anthology by Eric Trist and Hugh Murray
 Tavistock Clinic – History

1920 establishments in England
Research institutes established in 1920
Research institutes in London
NHS mental health trusts
Health in London
Mental health organisations in the United Kingdom
Social science methodology
Psychological methodology
Qualitative research
NHS foundation trusts
London Borough of Camden
Buildings and structures in the London Borough of Camden
History of the London Borough of Camden
Psychiatric research institutes
Medical research institutes in the United Kingdom